Senator Lyons may refer to:
Edward H. Lyons (1855–1920), Wisconsin State Senate
James Lyons (Virginia politician) (1801–1882), Virginia State Senate
Owen P. Lyons (1849–1933), Maine State Senate
Patrick H. Lyons (born 1953), New Mexico State Senate
Virginia V. Lyons (born 1944), Vermont State Senate
William J. Lyons Jr. (1921–2014), Connecticut State Senate

See also
Senator Lyon (disambiguation)